In enzymology, a phycoerythrobilin:ferredoxin oxidoreductase is an enzyme that catalyzes the chemical reaction

(3Z)-phycoerythrobilin + oxidized ferredoxin  15,16-dihydrobiliverdin + reduced ferredoxin

Thus, the two substrates of this enzyme are (3Z)-phycoerythrobilin and oxidized ferredoxin, whereas its two products are 15,16-dihydrobiliverdin and reduced ferredoxin.

This enzyme belongs to the family of oxidoreductases, specifically those acting on the CH-CH group of donor with an iron-sulfur protein as acceptor.  The systematic name of this enzyme class is (3Z)-phycoerythrobilin:ferredoxin oxidoreductase. This enzyme is also called PebB.  This enzyme participates in porphyrin and chlorophyll metabolism.

References

 

EC 1.3.7
Enzymes of unknown structure